The Consolidated Bank of Canada was created from the merger of  City Bank and Royal Canadian Bank in 1876, collapsed in 1880 and liquidated in 1882.

Defunct banks of Canada
Banks disestablished in 1882
Banks established in 1876
Canadian companies established in 1876
1876 establishments in Ontario
1882 disestablishments in Canada
Companies based in Toronto